The 1951 German Grand Prix was a Formula One motor race held on 29 July 1951 at the Nürburgring Nordschleife. It was race 6 of 8 in the 1951 World Championship of Drivers.

Report
Alfa Romeo once again fielded four cars, with local driver Paul Pietsch replacing Consalvo Sanesi, joining Fangio, Farina and Bonetto. Following on from their maiden victory at Silverstone, Ferrari also entered four drivers. Piero Taruffi rejoined their lineup, alongside Ascari, Villoresi and British Grand Prix winner José Froilán González. Ferrari continued their good form from the previous event, with Ascari and González the fastest two qualifiers. Fangio and Farina completed the front row, with Villoresi, Taruffi and Pietsch making up the second row.

Nino Farina initially took the lead, but, by the end of the first lap, had been passed by Fangio, Ascari and González. Paul Pietsch was running in fifth, but ended up at the back of the field after going off on the second lap. When Farina was forced to retire due to overheating problems, Fangio was left as the sole Alfa Romeo able to take the fight to the Ferrari drivers. Alberto Ascari took the lead on the fifth lap as a result of Fangio's first pitstop, but Fangio returned to the lead when Ascari took to the pits. As the Alfas required two pitstops, as opposed to just one for the Ferraris, Fangio needed to build a large lead in his second stint if he wanted to retain the lead after his second stop. He was unable to do so, therefore Ascari reclaimed the lead on the fifteenth lap of the race. Due to a misbehaving engine and a gearbox with only 3rd and 4th (4th being the highest gear), Fangio was unable to take advantage of an unexpected tyre change for Ascari, meaning that the Italian took his maiden World Championship race victory by over half a minute from Fangio. González completed the podium, with the remaining points positions going to the other works Ferraris of Villoresi and Taruffi.

Ascari's victory took him to second in the Championship standings, ten points adrift of Fangio, who extended his lead from the previous race. After his second consecutive podium, José Froilán González moved up to third in the standings, level on points with Farina and Villoresi.

Entries

 — Paul Pietsch qualified and raced in a different car, the #78 Alfa Romeo.
 — Prince Bira, Erik Lundgren and Chico Landi all withdrew from the event prior to practice.

Classification

Qualifying

Race

Notes
 – Includes 1 point for fastest lap

Championship standings after the race 
Drivers' Championship standings

 Note: Only the top five positions are listed. Only the best 4 results counted towards the Championship. Numbers without parentheses are Championship points; numbers in parentheses are total points scored.

References

German
German Grand Prix
German Grand Prix
Sport in Rhineland-Palatinate
German